Solomon Augustus Bates (born April 18, 1982) is a former American football linebacker of the National Football League. He was drafted by the Seattle Seahawks in the fourth round of the 2003 NFL Draft. He played college football at Arizona State.

1982 births
Living people
American football safeties
Arizona State Sun Devils football players
People from Moreno Valley, California
Players of American football from California
Seattle Seahawks players
Sportspeople from Riverside County, California